22.2 or Hamasaki 22.2 (named after Kimio Hamasaki, a senior research engineer at NHK Science & Technology Research Laboratories in Japan) is the surround sound component of Super Hi-Vision (a new television standard with 16 times the pixel resolution (7680×4320) of HDTV (1920x1080). It has been developed by NHK Science & Technical Research Laboratories. It uses 24 speakers (including two subwoofers) arranged in three layers.

Channels 

The channel numbers and labels are: 

Channel numbers up to 6 represent the same as those in a 5.1 channel system. There are then a further 5 listener-plane channels, 9 overhead channels, arranged in a square, and a row of 3 further channels at the bottom front, plus the additional LFE channel.

Demonstrations 
 Expo 2005, Aichi, Japan
 NAB Show 2006, Las Vegas, US
 IBC 2006, Amsterdam, Netherlands
 IBC 2008, Amsterdam, Netherlands
 NAB Show 2009, Las Vegas, US
 IBC 2010, Amsterdam, Netherlands
 IBC 2011, Amsterdam, Netherlands
 2012 Summer Olympics, Bradford/Glasgow/London, UK

Reviews 
 Ultra HD draws crowds, interest at NAB2006 at Broadcast Engineering Magazine, May 2, 2006

See also 

 Ultra-high-definition television
 Surround sound
 NHK BS8K

References

External links 
 22.2 Multichannel Sound System for Ultra High-Definition TV article at the Wayback Machine
 22.2 Standardization of Multichannel Sound System Japanese article at the Wayback Machine

Film sound production
Film and video technology
Surround sound
Ultra-high-definition television